Pityohyphantes cristatus is a species of sheetweb spider in the family Linyphiidae. It is found in the United States.

Subspecies
These two subspecies belong to the species Pityohyphantes cristatus:
 (Pityohyphantes cristatus cristatus) Chamberlin & Ivie, 1942
 Pityohyphantes cristatus coloradensis Chamberlin & Ivie, 1942

References

Linyphiidae
Articles created by Qbugbot
Spiders described in 1942